US Highway 20 (US 20) is an east–west highway in the state of Wyoming. The eastern segment of US 20 in the state starts at the eastern entrance to Yellowstone National Park along with the western termini of US 14 and US 16. US 14/US 16/US 20 runs east to Greybull, where US 14 continues east and US 16/US 20 turns south; at Worland, US 16 turns east while US 20 continues south, passing through Wind River Canyon south of Thermopolis. US 20 joins US 26 in Shoshoni, where it turns east and continues all the way through Casper. I-25/US 20/US 26/US 87 stays combined to Orin, where US 20 turns east from I-25, at the western end of US 18. US 18/US 20 run concurrently from Orin to Lusk, where US 18 turns north and US 20 continues east into Nebraska.

Route description

Yellowstone National Park

Google Maps and other mapmakers may show US 20 and other U.S. Routes going through Yellowstone National Park; however, they are officially discontinuous and unsigned inside the park.

Unofficially, Google Maps marks the start of the western part of US 20, along with US 191 and US 287, at the state line near West Yellowstone, Montana. The road parallels the Madison River until a junction with US 89. The three routes then turn south along US 89 (Grand Loop Road), paralleling the Firehole River. Past Old Faithful, the four routes curve east before reaching the West Thumb of Yellowstone Lake. While the rest of the routes turn south, US 20 travels northeast along the lake. US 20 even leaves the Grand Loop Road at an intersection midway along the lake. This intersection also marks the western "termini" of US 14 and US 16.

Yellowstone–Nebraska state line

The eastern section of US 20 begins at the east entrance of Yellowstone National Park. US 20, along with US 14 and US 16, then meanders east along the Shoshone River, heading toward Wapiti, Buffalo Bill Reservoir, and Cody. US 14A begins at Cody and continues to follow the river, while the three head straight to Greybull. Before Greybull, however, WYO 789 joins the concurrency. At Greybull, US 14 leaves the concurrency. At this point, the concurrency parallels the Bighorn River. In Worland, US 16 turns east and leaves the concurrency. South of the Boysen Dam, the road runs along the eastern front of the Boysen Reservoir. In Shoshoni, US 20 turns east along US 26, while WYO 789 turns west along the same route.

As US 20 and US 26 head toward Casper, the two routes travel along a limited-access road before traveling east along I-25 and US 87. US 20, US 26, and US 87 exit onto Beverly Street (exit 186) and travel east along Yellowstone Highway. Before reaching Glenrock, the three U.S. routes are sandwiched between the North Platte River to the north and I-25 to the south. The three routes rejoins the interstate after Glenrock. US 20 leaves the freeway at Orin; this interchange is also where US 18 begins eastward. US 87 briefly joins the concurrency before US 20 turns east away from US 18/US 85. After passing through Van Tassell, US 20 crosses the Nebraska state line.

History 
U.S. Route 20 became a U.S. highway in 1926. Prior to 1940, it ended at Yellowstone National Park. In 1940, it was extended westward to Albany, Oregon; however, as U.S. routes are not formally designated in national parks such as Yellowstone, US 20 can be thought of as made up of two parts broken by Yellowstone National Park.

Major intersections

References

External links

U.S. Highways in Wyoming
Wyoming
Transportation in Park County, Wyoming
Transportation in Big Horn County, Wyoming
Transportation in Washakie County, Wyoming
Transportation in Hot Springs County, Wyoming
Transportation in Fremont County, Wyoming
Transportation in Natrona County, Wyoming
Transportation in Converse County, Wyoming
Transportation in Niobrara County, Wyoming